Rhinocoryne is a genus of sea snails, marine gastropod mollusks in the family Batillariidae.

Species
Species within the genus Rhinocoryne include:
 Rhinocoryne humboltdi (Valenciennes, 1832)

References

 Ozawa, T., Köhler, F., Reid, D.G. & Glaubrecht, M. (2009). Tethyan relicts on continental coastlines of the northwestern Pacific Ocean and Australasia: molecular phylogeny and fossil record of batillariid gastropods (Caenogastropoda, Cerithioidea). Zoologica Scripta, 38: 503-525

Batillariidae
Monotypic gastropod genera